Elk Mountain Ski Resort is a ski area in the Endless Mountains on the summit of Elk Hill in Susquehanna County, Pennsylvania. The mountain has been given favorable reviews from Ski Magazine, including a listing in "Six Unsung Heroes", a roundup of hidden gems in skiing.

History
Elk Mountain opened in 1959. The ski area provided a small lodge, a  T-Bar ski lift, tow rope lifts and a small number of trails. In 1961, a double chair lift was installed, allowing for additional trails. A year later, in 1962, snowmaking was added along with a new A-frame lodge at the base of the mountain. Night skiing came to Elk Mountain in 1966, and trails were expanded further in 1972.

Skiing at Elk Mountain

North Chair at Elk Mountain accesses a top elevation of —the highest lift-serviced skiing in eastern Pennsylvania. Elk has a  vertical drop, 27 trails  (six greens, 10 blues and 11 diamonds) and two terrain parks. Five double chair lifts and a fixed-grip quad chair lift provide access to the top of the mountain. Four of the lifts, including the quad, run from the base to just below the summit of the mountain. Most ski runs are groomed, but a few are allowed to bump up, or become moguled, to allow for additional challenge. The mountain receives, on average, 5 feet of natural snow per season. The base complex features a day lodge, guest services, ski school center, restaurant, rentals, and a ski-and-snowboard shop.

Climate
According to the Trewartha climate classification system, Elk Mountain Ski Area has a Temperate Continental (Dc) Climate with warm summers (b), cold winters (o) and year-around precipitation. Dcbo climates are characterized by at least one month having an average mean temperature ≤ , four to seven months with an average mean temperature ≥ , all months with an average mean temperature <  and no significant precipitation difference between seasons. During the summer months at Elk Mountain Ski Area, episodes of high heat and humidity can occur with heat index values ≥  at the summit and ≥  at the base. The annual peak in thunderstorm activity is July. During the winter months, episodes of extreme cold and wind can occur with wind chill values <  at the summit and <  at the base. Ice storms and large snowstorms depositing ≥  of snow are somewhat frequent, particularly during nor’easters from December through March.

References

External links
Elk Mountain Ski Resort
Elk Mountain Area Directory

Buildings and structures in Susquehanna County, Pennsylvania
Ski areas and resorts in Pennsylvania
Pocono Mountains
Tourist attractions in Susquehanna County, Pennsylvania
1959 establishments in Pennsylvania